Prince Boris Borisovich Golitsyn ( – ) was a prominent Russian physicist who invented the first electromagnetic seismograph in 1906. He was one of the founders of modern Seismology. In 1911 he was chosen to be the president of the International Seismology Association.

He was a plenary speaker on the International Congress of mathematicians in Cambridge 1912, and in 1916 was elected as member of the Royal Society. He belonged to the Golitsyn family, one of the leading noble houses of Imperial Russia.

References

External links

The Academic Krilov about Galitzine 
scientific academic ship Galitzine 

1862 births
1916 deaths
Physicists from the Russian Empire
Russian geophysicists
Russian seismologists
Boris Borisovich
Inventors from the Russian Empire
Foreign Members of the Royal Society
Full members of the Saint Petersburg Academy of Sciences
Burials at Nikolskoe Cemetery
Privy Councillor (Russian Empire)
Russian princes